Big Blues is an album featuring Jimmy Witherspoon supported by a band of British jazz musicians. It was originally released in 1981, and was subsequently re-released in 1997, the year Witherspoon died.

Track listing 

"You Got Me Runnin'"
"Whiskey Drinking Woman"
"Once There Lived a Fool"
"Just a Dream"
"Lotus Blossom"
"Big Boss Man" – (Luther Dixon, Al Smith)
"Nobody Knows You When You're Down and Out" – (Jimmy Cox)
"That's the One"
"Let's Think Awhile"
"Swing on It"
"Point"
"Snow Was Falling"

Personnel

Jimmy Witherspoon – vocals
Jim Mullen – guitar
Peter King – alto saxophone
Mike Carr – piano, electric piano, organ
Harold Smith – drums
Hal Singer – tenor saxophone

1981 albums
Jimmy Witherspoon albums
Blues albums by American artists